Cihan Topaloğlu (born 30 March 1992) is a Turkish footballer who plays as a goalkeeper for Sakaryaspor.

Career
A youth product of Bozdoğan Belediyespor, Balçovaspor, and Altınordu, Topaloğlu signed his first professional contract with Altınordu in 2009. He made his senior debut with them in a 2–0 TFF Third League win over Muğlaspor on 25 April 2010. Usually Altay's reserve goalkeepers, played amateur football from 2012 to 2014 before returning to Altay where he went on successive loans to Bucaspor 1928, Manisa FK and Silivrispor. He transferred to Çaykur Rizespor in 2017, and helped them win the 2017–18 TFF First League. He joined Altay in 2019, and helped them get promoted into the Süper Lig in 2021. He made his professional debut with Altay in a 1–0 Turkish Cup loss to Beşiktaş on 30 December 2021.

Honours
Çaykur Rizespor
TFF First League: 2017–18

References

External links
 
 

1992 births
Footballers from İzmir
Living people
Turkish footballers
Association football goalkeepers
Altınordu F.K. players
Manisa FK footballers
Çaykur Rizespor footballers
Altay S.K. footballers
Sakaryaspor footballers
Süper Lig players
TFF First League players
TFF Second League players
TFF Third League players